Bola language may refer to:
Bola language (Austronesian)
the Chinese rendering of the Pela language